The Hoxton, Portland is a hotel in Portland, Oregon's Old Town Chinatown neighborhood, in the United States. The 119-room hotel, part of the European chain, opened on November 12, 2018. The property includes the renovated three-story Grove Hotel, which opened in 1907, as well as a nine-story addition. Also featured are lobby restaurant called La Neta, a rooftop taqueria called Tope, and a speakeasy in the basement.

References

External links

 
 

2018 establishments in Oregon
Hotels established in 2018
Hotels in Portland, Oregon
Old Town Chinatown
Northwest Portland, Oregon